Simsboro High School is in Simsboro, Louisiana, United States, and is a part of the Lincoln Parish School Board

History
Simsboro High School was founded in 1855 by James M. Sims.  The school became recognized by the state in 1904 and saw the addition of a junior high wing in 2006.  The principal is Ms. Leslie Holcomb

Student life
Simsboro High School educates children in grades Kindergarten through 12. Students can also participate in cheerleading, student government, or clubs and activities such as 4-H.

Athletics
Simsboro High athletics competes in the LHSAA.

The school fields teams in baseball, boys & girls basketball, softball, and track & field.

Notable alumni

L.D. "Buddy" Napper, state representative for Lincoln Parish from 1952 to 1964

Notable faculty

Tommy Joe Eagles, basketball coach prior to taking head coaching position at Louisiana Tech University

References

External links
 High School Website

Public high schools in Louisiana
Public middle schools in Louisiana
Public elementary schools in Louisiana
Schools in Lincoln Parish, Louisiana
Educational institutions established in 1855
1855 establishments in Louisiana